The Alan Davies Show was a short-lived radio program that aired from May – June 1998. The show revolved around Alan Davies playing himself as a struggling actor, and the relationship with his best friends Kate (Ronni Ancona) and Murray (Alan Francis). The series also featured British actors Kevin Eldon, Dave Lamb, Caroline Loncq, Alistair McGowan, Debra Stephenson, and Kim Wall.

Only one series of 6 half-hour episodes was made, which aired on Wednesday evenings on BBC Radio 4. A year later the series was repeated at 11.00p.m. on Tuesdays, with a six-month gap between episode 1 and 2. The series was recorded at Broadcasting House.

The theme tune was Crazy by Barenaked Ladies.

Four episodes were released on audiocassette by BBC Audiobooks Ltd in May 1999. The series is no longer on sale.

Episode list

External links

External links
Lavalie, John The Alan Davies Show EpGuides, 14 May 2005
Arnold, Steve The Alan Davies Show British Comedy, 2005

BBC Radio comedy programmes
BBC Radio 4 programmes
1998 radio programme debuts